Moorehouse is a surname. Notable people with the surname include:
 Alan Moorehouse Charlesworth (1904–1978), a senior commander in the Royal Australian Air Force
 Francis Moorehouse (died 1982), an American labor relations specialist
 Ruth Ann "Ouisch" Moorehouse (born 1951), member of the criminal Manson Family

See also
 Moore House (disambiguation)
 Moorhouse (surname)
 Morehouse (disambiguation)

English-language surnames